The following is a list of notable people who were either born in, lived in, are current residents of, or are otherwise closely associated with the city or county of Los Angeles, California. Those not born in Los Angeles have their places of birth listed instead. Los Angeles natives are also referred to as Angelenos .

A

B

C

D

E

F

G

H

I

 Grant Imahara – MythBusters
 Kid Ink – rapper
 Joe Inoue – singer
 Bob Israel (composer) – who works primarily on silent films
 Ice Cube
 Ashton Irwin – singer-songwriter, musician, member of 5 Seconds of Summer (born in Australia)
 Lance Ito – judge (presided over the O. J. Simpson trial)

J

K

L

M

N

O

P

Q
 Jack Quaid – actor (The Boys)
 Anthony Quinn – actor (Originally from Chihuahua City, Mexico)

R

S

T

U
 Andrew Ullmann – politician 
 Usher – musician (born in Dallas, TX)
 Brendon Urie – singer (born in St. George, Utah)
 Terdema Ussery – CEO of NBA's Dallas Mavericks
 Cenk Uygur – host of The Young Turks (born in Istanbul, Turkey)

V
Laura Vandervoort – actress, martial artists (born in Toronto, Canada)
 Ritchie Valens – musician, composer
 Leslie Van Houten – Charles Manson acolyte (Born in Altadena, California)
 Gwen Verdon – actress, dancer (born in Culver City)
 Sofia Vergara – actress
 Victoria – professional wrestler (born in San Bernardino, California)
 Antonio Villaraigosa – former Mayor of Los Angeles
 Roy Marlin "Butch" Voris – World War II flying ace and founder of the United States Navy Blue Angels

W

Y
 
 Elliott Yamin – singer
 Zev Yaroslavsky – politician
 Dwight Yoakam – country music singer and songwriter (Born in Pikeville, Kentucky)
 Sam Yorty – 37th mayor of Los Angeles (July 1, 1961 – July 1, 1973) – Originally from Lincoln, Nebraska
 Ace Young – singer (originally from Boulder, Colorado)
 Nick Young – basketball player
 Robert Clark Young – novelist and Wikipedia "revenge editor"
 Lee Thompson Young (1984–2013) – actor (Originally from Columbia, South Carolina)
 Tony Young – actor (Originally from New York City)

Z
 Louis Zamperini – Olympian and war hero (born in Olean, New York, raised in Torrance)
 Richard D. Zanuck – film producer
 Ahmet Zappa – musician
 Dweezil Zappa – musician
 Todd Zeile – baseball player (born in Van Nuys)
 Lance Zeno – NFL player
 Stephanie Zimbalist – actress (born in New York City, raised in Los Angeles)
 Valerie Zimring – rhythmic gymnast

See also

References

01
P01
Lists of people by city in the United States
Lists of people from California